Mauremys pritchardi is an interspecific hybrid turtle in the family Geoemydidae. M. pritchardi, described to be from Myanmar (where neither of the parental species occurs apparently), has been found in the wild in China and Japan, and is produced to some extent in Chinese turtle farms. It was listed as data deficient in the IUCN Red List before its actual origin became known.

The parents of this hybrid are the Chinese pond turtle (Mauremys reevesii ) and the Asian yellow pond turtle (Mauremys mutica). While it is not unusual for perfectly valid geoemydid species to arise from hybridization, recognition as a species would require that the hybrids be fertile and constitute a phenotypically distinct and self-sustaining lineage. This does not yet appear to be the case in this "species" as recently (Kosukawa et al. 2006) a population of these turtles has been found in Japan. The hybrid offspring are perfectly fertile, which is not the case in Mauremys iversoni for example, another intergeneric hybrid, and have been bred in captivity already, with all juveniles resembling their parents (and not the parental species) perfectly as well. Genetic studies verify its hybrid origin but scientists are unsure of the time of creation. According to Wink et al. 2001, it might well be a very ancient hybrid, while Parham et al. 2001 suppose that it is of rather recent origin.

Etymology
The specific name, pritchardi, is in honour of British herpetologist Peter Pritchard.

See also
Fujian pond turtle
Ocadia glyphistoma
Ocadia philippeni
Cuora serrata

References

Further reading
McCord, William P. (1997). "Mauremys pritchardi, a new Batagurid turtle from Myanmar and Yunnan, China". Chelonian Conserv. Biol. 2 (4): 555–562.

External links
 
 (2005). "On the hybridisation between two distantly related Asian turtles (Testudines: Sacalia × Mauremys)". Salamandra 41: 21–26. PDF fulltext.
  (2001). "New Chinese turtles: endangered or invalid? A reassessment of two species using mitochondrial DNA, allozyme electrophoresis and known-locality specimens". Animal Conservation 4 (4): 357–367. HTML abstract Erratum: Animal Conservation 5 (1): 86. HTML abstract

Mauremys
Taxonomy articles created by Polbot
Hybrid animals